The MV Leif Ericson is a commercial passenger/vehicle ferry in service with the Canadian operator Marine Atlantic. She is currently the oldest vessel in the Marine Atlantic fleet. She was built along with two sister ships by Fosen Mekaniske Verksteder, Norway in the early 1990s. These two are Oslofjord and Patria Seaways.

Stena
The vessel was built in Fosen, Norway in 1991 as MS Stena Challenger for Stena Line. She originally operated across the English Channel between Dover, England, and Calais, France.

Marine Atlantic

The vessel was purchased by the Government of Canada for its Crown corporation Marine Atlantic in 2001 and underwent modifications in preparation for operating the 178 km route between North Sydney, Nova Scotia and Port aux Basques, Newfoundland and Labrador.

She was renamed Leif Ericson in honour of the 1000th anniversary of Leif Ericson's settlement in Newfoundland, reportedly the first European to set foot in the New World.

In June 2010, Marine Atlantic announced an extensive midlife refit of approximately $18 million over the next twelve months for the MV Leif Ericson.

In May 2015, she was in Deyton's Shipyard, Charleston, SC for repainting and other repairs.

Incidents
On 19 September 1995 Stena Challenger ran aground on Blériot Plage whilst waiting to enter the port of Calais.

On 26 October 2006 Leif Ericson collided with a concrete structure in Port aux Basques after losing power.

Vessel specifications
The vessel has a capacity of 500 passengers and 300 passenger vehicles (combination of automobiles and tractor trailers).

She usually operates carrying commercial vehicles only on the North Sydney-Port aux Basques route.

References

External links

Marine Atlantic
Ferries of Nova Scotia
Ferries of Newfoundland and Labrador
Ships built in Rissa, Norway
1991 ships